Do not Shoot at White Swans is a 1980 Soviet drama film in two parts by the director Rodion Nakhapetov, based on the novel of the same name by Boris Vasilyev.

Plot 
Egor Polushkin (Stanislav Lyubshin) lives in a village. The villagers, including his wife, nickname him as the "Harbinger of Woes" - for all for what he undertakes, any work or business ends in disaster.

Egor is quite different from the villagers, he is practical and sensible. Polushkin is endowed with the talent of a true artist, with his own outlook on life. After a long search, Polushkin finally finds his calling - he gets a job as a gamekeeper. White swans become Yegor's only friends, of which he takes care of with utmost tenderness. But one day his luck ends: to the forest come poachers who without hesitation kill the tame swans.

Cast  
 Stanislav Lyubshin   
 Nina Ruslanova 
 Vladimir Zamansky
 Viktor Anisimov   
 Vera Glagoleva  
 Ivars Kalnins 
 Ivan Agafonov   
 Yevgeni Nikitchenko   
 Nastasya Gladkova   
 Grigori Shpigel   
 Anatoli Vedenkin   
 Lyubov Sokolova   
 Konstantin Grigoryev

External links

1980 films
Soviet drama films
Mosfilm films
Films based on works by Boris Vasilyev
1980 drama films